Cawston College (1964-1999) was  an independent co-educational day and boarding school, situated in the village of Cawston Norfolk in the United Kingdom. It was a Woodard School.

History
Cawston Manor had been constructed by George Yeates builder on behalf of George Cawston, an English stockbroker, who settled in the area in 1897. The architect of the Manor House was  Sir Ernest George  well respected in his designs, who mentored the famous architect Edward Lutyens. George Cawston beguiled by the fact that the village had his name, bought land near the village of Cawston.  He had one son Cecil Faulkner Cawston. Whose godfather was Cecil Rhodes, long time friend of George Cawston. Cecil Rhodes travelled on a number of occasions from Rhodesia to stay at the Manor House. When George Cawstons only son Cecil was killed in the Boer War in South Africa in 1901, the Cawstons were heart broken. In memory of their son, stained glass windows and brass plaque dedicated to their son can be found in one of the naves in Norwich Cathedral.  In order for the construction of the new Manor House in 1897, builder George Yeates had to locate a good fresh water supply,  this was located by water divining to the west of the Manor. Here a 90ft beautifully designed water tower (Dutch style) by Sir Ernest George was constructed complete with internal 100ft fresh water well. A cast iron pipe was laid from the new tower to the area of construction for the new Manor House, to supply fresh water for the construction and good potable water.

School

Cawston College, one of the Woodard Schools, opened in 1964  at the former manor house of Cawston, Norfolk, with Mr. John Asquith as Headmaster.  Two American students attended in the late 80s and are currently U.S. Marine pilots.  It was an independent Christian College with its own Chapel for day and boarding boys and later included girls. It had a good reputation and accommodated dyslexic pupils.

In addition to its academic work, the school was keen to provide as broad a range of activities for its pupils as possible.  There were ambitious annual hill-walking expeditions, including destinations in South America and India, an active Duke of Edinburgh Award scheme and most pupils were encouraged to join the Combined Cadet Force, all run by members of the school staff. The College grounds included woods, heathland and a lake with boat house (a total of about 135 acres), which aided the provision outdoor education and adventurous activity.

The senior school had two Houses, those of Woodard and School House; when Girls were eventually admitted to the college they were also assigned to one of these houses. Over the course of the school's history the houses remained fairly balanced in terms of sports, however Woodard won Sports Day for 7 consecutive years between 1987-1993.

The number of pupils over the years had fluctuated from 45 at the opening of the college to 145 then to 96 when it closed, 120 pupils were reportedly required for it to survive.  The College closed in 1999 after a series of rescue bids were put forward, which were rejected by the school governors, much to the annoyance of parents and staff members.

10 July 1999 was the final day of the summer term and speech day when television journalist Kate Adie, who had a godson at the college was guest speaker.  After the school closed there was an auction of its equipment, which was reported on in the local press.  In one classroom a simple phrase had been left written on a board, "This was a good school," while in another a message had been left which told another widely felt opinion.  A single word.  "Betrayed."

Headmasters:-
 1964  John P.K. Asquith
 1986  James Berry
 1991  John Sutton
 On the retirement of Mr Sutton, Mrs Barbara Harrison took over and stayed until the College closed.

Hospital
After closure the main school buildings were used by International Foundation of Inspiration, Spirituality and Healing (IFISH), who used it for the study, promotion and practice of psychic science and spiritual healing until 2003.

The site then became the home of Cawston Park psychiatric hospital. In November 2006 former Tory MP David Prior, non-executive chairman of Cawston Park was arrested among others by Norfolk Constabulary who were investigating allegiations of financial irregularities. He was cleared of involvement in the alleged fraud on 15 February 2007   The hospital closed in 2009 in the aftermath of the trial, along with its sister unit Kelling Park near Holt, after owners Chancellor Care went into administration.  In 2010 it was sold to the Jeesal Group for use as a specialist hospital providing treatment for adults with learning difficulties and problems including mental-health breakdowns.

Current use
The school's old water tower has been converted into a house by former pupil David (Ronnie) Forster.  This conversion has been featured on Channel 5's Build a New Life in the Country.The conversion took 15 years to complete. The building is grade II listed with a miniature tower added to the main Tower. Views from the very top of the Tower show the east Anglian coastline and before the trees had grown, a view of Norwich Cathedral Spire.

Notable former pupils

Nick Youngs, England scrum-half.
Herbie Hide, the heavyweight boxer, was a pupil at the College in the 1980s.
Jacyn Heavens, the serial entrepreneur, CEO & Founder of Epos Now.
David Forster, known for his conversion of the Cawston Water Tower, explored on Channel 5's Build a New Life in the Country, hosted by George Clarke.

References

Further reading
Cowie, Leonard & Evelyn (1991). That One Idea: Nathaniel Woodard and His Schools. Ellesmere, Shropshire: Woodard Corporation; pp. 143–45: Cawston College, Norfolk

External links
Short article on the school

Defunct Church of England schools
Member schools of the Headmasters' and Headmistresses' Conference
Boarding schools in Norfolk
Defunct schools in Norfolk
Single sex schools that were converted to mixed in Norfolk
Educational institutions established in 1964
1964 establishments in England

Educational institutions disestablished in 1999
1999 disestablishments in England